Hardev Bahri (also Bahari; 1907—2000) was an Indian linguist, literary critic, and lexicographer of the 20th century, notable for his work in Hindi, Punjabi, and other related Indo-Aryan languages. He compiled numerous monolingual and bilingual dictionaries for both general and technical purposes in collaboration with the publisher Rajpal and Sons.

Life
Bahri was born on 1 January 1907 in Talagang, near Attock, Punjab, then part of the British Raj.

He obtained his Ph.D. from Panjab University. Likely due to the Partition of India, he migrated to Allahabad, Uttar Pradesh and became a professor in the Department of Hindi at the University of Allahabad, where in 1959 he also earned his Doctor of Letters for his seminal work Hindi Semantics. He occupied that post for over two decades, pursuing academic research in both theoretical and applied linguistics as well as literary criticism.

He died on 31 March 2000.

Works

References

20th-century Indian linguists
Indian lexicographers
Indian literary critics
Academic staff of the University of Allahabad
University of Allahabad alumni
Panjab University alumni
1907 births
2000 deaths
Linguists of Hindi
Linguists of Punjabi
20th-century lexicographers